Geisha Girl is a 1952 American adventure film directed and produced by George Breakston and C. Ray Stahl, and starring Steve Forrest, Martha Hyer, Tetsu Nakamura, Heihachirō Ōkawa, and Dekao Yokoo. The full film was shot in Tokyo, Japan. The plot was, in fact, created so as to educate American viewers of such Japanese traditions as a Kabuki theater presentation, a Buddhist religious ceremony, and a geisha house. Despite these features, the Japanese people were presented as stock characters or buffoons. Martha Hyer did not play the main role in the film, yet got the top billing.

Plot
Two American soldiers—Rocky Wilson (Steve Forrest) and Archie McGregor (Archer MacDonald)—serve in the Korea War. One day they are on the leave in Tokyo. The easygoing duo wants to visit night clubs and bars, but GIs are not allowed to enter there. Therefore, the two want to find civilian clothing to do what they want. They go to a recommended black market shop and buy new cloth. Archie discovers strange pills in the breastpocket of the suit jacket, and the sales clerck wants to cancel the deal, but they are interrupted by the military police. Rocky and Archie are trailed to a bar where Mr. Nakano (Tetsu Nakamura), who is a powerful gang leader, encounter them and invites them to visit his home, mentioning that there is a geisha school there.

Rocky Wilson and Archie McGregor are accompanied by stewardess Peggy Barnes (Martha Hyer), who is actually a government spy trying to track down the mysterious pills because they are very powerful explosives, even more dangerous than a nuclear bomb. Nakano, assisted by his henchmen and some geisha, tries to get the pills from Archie but fails to do so because one geisha girl, Michiko, informs Peggy who, in turn, informs the police. The police captain forcefully invites Zoro (Dekao Yokoo), a powerful hypnotist, to get involved in the events. The gangsters keep on chasing the pills, but the conjuror-magician finally manages to subdue the villains. The two soldiers are left in the Peggy Burnes's custody.

Cast
Steve Forrest as Rocky Wilson
Martha Hyer as Peggy Burnes
Archer MacDonald as Archie MacGregor
Tetsu Nakamura as Tetsu Nakano
Heihachirō Ōkawa as Police Inspector
Dekao Yokoo as Zoro
Michiyo Naoki as Michiko
Ralph Nagara as Betto

Reception
Hal Erickson of AllMovie gave the film 1.5 stars out of five.

See also
 List of American films of 1952

References

External links

1952 films
1950s mystery films
Films about geisha
Films set in Tokyo
Films shot in Japan
1952 adventure films
Films directed by George Breakston
Films scored by Albert Glasser
Japan in non-Japanese culture
American adventure films
American mystery films
American black-and-white films
1950s English-language films
1950s American films